Dalkeith is a town in Midlothian, Scotland.

Dalkeith may also refer to:

Related to Dalkeith, Scotland:
Dalkeith Palace
Dalkeith Rugby Football Club
Dalkeith Thistle F.C.
Dalkeith High School
Earl of Dalkeith, subsidiary title of the Duke of Buccleuch.

Other uses:
Dalkeith, Western Australia, a suburb of Perth
Dalkeith, Ontario, Canada
Dalkeith, Florida, U.S., an unincorporated town
Dalkeith (Arcola, North Carolina), U.S., a historic plantation house
Dalkeith (film), a 2002 Australian film
Dalkeith Property, a historic house in the Sydney suburb of Cremorne